BID 610 or Alvis was a British cipher machine used by both British and Canadian governments. It was the first fully transistorised full-duplex online cipher machine used by the British Army. It was introduced in the 1960s.

References

External links
ALVIS cypher machine at liedra.net

Cryptographic hardware